
Year 750 (DCCL) was a common year starting on Thursday (link will display the full calendar) of the Julian calendar. The denomination 750 for this year has been used since the early medieval period, when the Anno Domini calendar era became the prevalent method in Europe for naming years.

Events 
 By place 

 Arab Caliphate 
 January 25 – Battle of the Zab: Abbasid forces under Abdallah ibn Ali defeat the Umayyads near the Great Zab River. Members of the Umayyad house are hunted down and killed. Defeated by his rivals, Caliph Marwan II flees westward to Egypt, perhaps attempting to reach Al-Andalus (Iberian Peninsula), where there are still significant Umayyad armies.

 August 6 – Marwan II is caught and killed at Faiyum by supporters of the Abbasid caliph As-Saffah. Almost the entire Umayyad Dynasty is assassinated; Prince Abd al-Rahman I escapes to Al-Andalus. The Abbasids assume control of the Islamic world and establish their first capital at Kufa.

 Europe 
 King Alfonso I of Asturias establishes the Kingdom of Galicia, in roughly the northwest of the Iberian Peninsula. The exact time this happened is contested. 
 The town Slaný in the Central Bohemian Region (Czech Republic) is founded at the site of a salt spring, according to one chronicle written in the sixteenth century (approximate date). 

 Britain 
 King Eadberht of Northumbria imprisons Cynewulf, bishop of Lindisfarne, at Bamburgh Castle. King Eadberht does this in order to punish the bishop for sheltering one of his enemies, Prince Offa. He then besieges Prince Offa, son of the late King Aldfrith, in Lindisfarne Priory. Almost dead from hunger, he is dragged from his sanctuary and put to death.
 Battle of Mugdock: The Strathclyde Britons under King Teudebur defeat Prince Talorgan of the Picts. This leads to the decline of the power of King Óengus I.

 Africa 
 The Ghana Empire begins (approximate date).

 India 
 Gopala I is proclaimed as the first ruler and founder of the Pala Empire.

 America 
 Native Americans, in the area now known as the Four Corners, begin constructing and occupying pueblos.
 The city of Teotihuacan (modern Mexico) is destroyed and left in ruins, its palaces burned to the ground.
 Indonesia 
Borobudur, or Barabudur (a Mahayana Buddhist temple in Magelang, Central Java, Indonesia, as well as the world's largest Buddhist temple, and also one of the greatest Buddhist monuments in the world) is built (approximate date).

 By topic 

 Art 
 The "Western Paradise" of Amitābha Buddha, detail of a wall painting in Cave 217, Dunhuang (China), is made during the Tang Dynasty (approximate date).
 Food and drink 
 In China during the Tang Dynasty, a bargeload of tea (a medicinal herb) comes up the Grand Canal to Luoyang, from Zhejiang (approximate date).

Births 
 January 25 – Leo IV, Byzantine emperor (d. 780)
 Abbas ibn al-Ahnaf, Abbasid poet (d. 809)
 Abd al-Malik ibn Salih, Abbasid general (d. 812)
 Arno, archbishop of Salzburg (approximate date)
 Bermudo I, king of Asturias (approximate date)
 Clement, Irish scholar and saint (approximate date)
 Eigil of Fulda, Bavarian abbot (approximate date)
 Hildegrim, bishop of Châlons (approximate date)
 Leo III, pope of the Catholic Church (d. 816)
 Ragnvald Sigurdsson, great-grandfather to Harald Hårfagre
 Sawara, Japanese prince (approximate date) 
 Theodulf, bishop of Orléans (or 760)
 Wu Shaocheng, general of the Tang Dynasty (d. 810)

Deaths 
 January 25 – Ibrahim ibn al-Walid, Umayyad caliph
 August 6 – Marwan II, ruling Umayyad caliph (b. 688)
 Abdallah ibn Abd al-Malik, Umayyad prince (or 749)
 Agilulfus, bishop of Cologne (approximate date)
 Al-Abbas ibn al-Walid, Umayyad prince and general
 Basil the Confessor, Eastern Orthodox saint
 Boruth, prince (knyaz) of Carantania (approximate date)
 Bressal mac Áedo Róin, Dál Fiatach king of Ulaid
 Burchard, bishop of Würzburg (approximate date)
 Himelin, Scottish priest (approximate date) 
 Inreachtach mac Dluthach, king of Uí Maine (Ireland)
 Irene of Khazaria, Byzantine empress (approximate date) 
 Isonokami no Otomaro, Japanese nobleman
 Veborg, Scandinavian shieldmaiden (approximate date)

References

External links